David Kannemeyer (born 8 July 1977) is a South African former professional soccer player who played as a left back. He played for Cape Town Spurs, Ajax Cape Town, Kaizer Chiefs, Mamelodi Sundowns, SuperSport United and Mpumalanga Black Aces, and he also played for the South Africa national team.

Club career
Kannemeyer was a founding member of Ajax Cape Town when Cape Town Spurs and Seven Stars amalgamated in 1999. In 2001, he moved to Kaizer Chiefs for R700 000.

References

External links

1977 births
South African soccer players
Living people
Soccer players from Cape Town
Cape Town Spurs F.C. players
Mamelodi Sundowns F.C. players
SuperSport United F.C. players
South Africa international soccer players
Olympic soccer players of South Africa
Footballers at the 2000 Summer Olympics
2002 African Cup of Nations players
2004 African Cup of Nations players
Cape Coloureds
Mpumalanga Black Aces F.C. players
Association football fullbacks